New Shoes is a song by Paolo Nutini.

New Shoes may also refer to:

TV
"New Shoes", an episode of Tots TV

Music
New Shoes Records, Diana Jones (singer-songwriter) and other artists
"New Shoes", a 1984 song by The Bus Boys, Brian O'Neal	
"New Shoes", a 1980 song by Mark Foggo and The Secret Meeting,   M. Foggo	
"New Shoes", a 1960 song by Pearl Bailey, Chandler
"New Shoes", a song by Seven Day Sonnet
"New Shoes", a song by Guy Sigsworth